Mirsaeed Molavian  (Persian: میرسعید مولویان; born June 27, 1989) is an Iranian actor. He gained recognition after portraying Reza Fakhar in the romance historical drama Once Upon a Time in Iran (2021). Molavian earned a Crystal Simorgh nomination, a Hafez Award nomination and an Iran's Film Critics and Writers Association Award nomination for his performance in Tooman (2020).

Filmography

Film

Web

Awards and nominations

References

External links 
 

1989 births
Living people
People from Tabriz
Iranian film actors
Iranian male actors